Wang Wenjuan (19 December 1926 – 6 August 2021) was a noted performer in Yue opera. She was well known for playing the title role Lin Daiyu in the 1962 film of Dream of the Red Chamber, an adaptation of a work by Cao Xueqin.

Biography 
Wang Wenjuan was born in Shengzhou, Zhejiang Province. In 1947, she and Lu Jinhua founded a yueju troupe called Shaozhuang Troupe (Chinese: 少壮越剧团) in Shanghai. In 1961, she married Sun Daolin who was a famous Chinese director. She died on 6 August 2021 in Huadong Hospital, Shanghai.

References 

Actresses from Shaoxing
People from Shengzhou
Singers from Zhejiang
Yue opera actresses
Chinese film actresses
Chinese television actresses
20th-century Chinese actresses
1926 births
2021 deaths
Musicians from Shaoxing